Murod Rajabov (born 5 July 1995) is an Uzbek footballer playing with FC Sogdiana Jizzakh in the Uzbek League.

Club career
Born in G‘uzor, Rajabov played with FC Shurtan Guzar in the 2015 Uzbek League, and with AGMK Olmaliq in the first half of the 2016 Uzbek League.

In summer 2016, he moved abroad and signed a loan with Serbian top-tier side FK Novi Pazar. He made 3 appearances in the 2016–17 Serbian SuperLiga and during winter-break he returned to his former club, Olmaliq FK.

Upon returning, he played on loan with PFC Navbahor Namangan in the 2017 Uzbek League. At the end of the season he returned to AGMK Olmaliq and was released, signing right next with FC Nurafshon Tashkent and helping the team to finish runner-up of the Uzbekistan Pro League B. He called the attention of top-league side FC Sogdiana Jizzakh that brought him to their squad for the 2019 Uzbekistan Super League.

International career
He was called for the Uzbekistani Olympic team training camp that took place from 11 to 16 July 2015.

Honours
Shurtan Guzar
UzPFL Cup: 2015

References

1995 births
Living people
Uzbekistani footballers
Uzbekistani expatriate footballers
Association football forwards
FC Shurtan Guzar players
FC AGMK players
Navbahor Namangan players
FC Sogdiana Jizzakh players
Uzbekistan Super League players
FK Novi Pazar players
Serbian SuperLiga players
Expatriate footballers in Serbia
Uzbekistani expatriate sportspeople in Serbia